"DeDe Dinah" is a song written by Peter De Angelis and Bob Marcucci and performed by Frankie Avalon. The song reached #7 on the Billboard Top 100 and #8 on the R&B chart in 1958. The song appeared on his 1958 album, Frankie Avalon.

The song was produced by Peter De Angelis and arranged by Al Caiola.

In media
The final The Dick Clark Show on September 10, 1960 featured a highlight of Avalon performing the song.
The song is mentioned in the 1974 Reunion song, "Life Is a Rock (But the Radio Rolled Me)".

References

1957 songs
1957 singles
Songs written by Bob Marcucci
Frankie Avalon songs
Chancellor Records singles
Songs written by Peter De Angelis